A Hundred Francs a Second (French: Cent francs par seconde) is a 1953 French comedy film directed by Jean Boyer and starring Henri Génès, Philippe Lemaire and Jeannette Batti. It is a spin-off from the French radio game show of the same name.

The film's sets were designed by the art director Robert Giordani.

Main cast
 Henri Génès as Fernand  
 Philippe Lemaire as Philippe  
 Jeannette Batti as Louloute  
 Jean-Jacques Vital as L'animateur  
 Geneviève Kervine as Jacqueline Bourdinet  
 Jacques Eyser as Le fakir 
 Gaston Orbal as Le secrétaire  
 Fred Pasquali as Bourdinet 
 Bourvil as himself  
 Mons. Champagne as himself  
 André Gillois as himself 
 Charles Rigoulot as himself  
 Ray Ventura as himself

References

Bibliography
 Alfred Krautz. International directory of cinematographers, set- and costume designers in film, Volume 4. Saur, 1984.

External links 
 

1953 films
French comedy films
1950s French-language films
1953 comedy films
Films directed by Jean Boyer
French black-and-white films
1950s French films